The BiLevel Coach is a bilevel passenger railcar currently built by Alstom and previously by Bombardier, Hawker Siddeley Canada, the Canadian Car and Foundry (Can Car), and the UTDC. Used by North American commuter rail operators, they hold 360 passengers and feature a distinctive octagonal profile.

History 
The BiLevel coaches were designed by Toronto's regional commuter rail service, GO Transit and Hawker Siddeley Canada in the mid-1970s as a more efficient replacement for GO's original single-deck coaches and cab cars. Later coaches were manufactured by Urban Transportation Development Corporation/Can-Car and, most recently, Bombardier. Alstom purchased Bombardier in 2021 and now owns the designs and manufacturing facility. There are more than 1,500 BiLevel coaches in service today,  all of which have been built in Thunder Bay, Ontario.

The coaches have gone over numerous design changes over the years, originally featuring more shorter windows and larger intermediate levels featuring the washroom on the aforementioned level, and 162 seats in the original series'. Now featuring fewer taller windows, smaller intermediate levels, 136 seats, and a fully accessible washroom on the lower level. The exterior was also changed from being riveted fibreglass sides to being welded steel panels featuring a cleaner look.

Construction 

BiLevel coaches have an aluminum body on a steel frame. They hold 136–162 seated passengers and 276 standees (depending on coach series and seat configuration) and have two pairs of doors on each side   

Some of the newer coaches have electrical outlets for laptop computers and other devices along with small tables. Newer coaches feature 2 outlets and 2 USB ports at every other seat. 

All newly built coaches since 1990 have a fully accessible washroom on the lower level; the original coaches for GO Transit have the washroom on the intermediate level in the same location as where the cab is located in cab cars, one prototype coach featured both the intermediate level washroom and the fully accessible lower level washroom, the intermediate washroom now being removed. The washrooms feature a stainless-steel chemical flush toilet, sink, mirrors, waste receptacles, air dryers, and occupancy lamps. The lower level washroom is accessible, featuring wide doors and grab bars. The older intermediate level washroom is much smaller in size. 

Older coaches featured water fountains and cup dispensers on the intermediate level connected to the washroom, which were removed due to harmless bacterial contaminations found inside them.  

Older coaches also featured retractable coat hooks at every seat, which were removed in the 2000’s due to the installation of priority emergency alarm buttons for passengers.  

TV’s were installed on select GO Transit coaches in 2007 to play weather, news, and sports. They were later removed due to the transition to digital transmissions and the incompatibility between the TV’s and digital broadcasting. 

West Coast Express has a quick service cafe in place of the lower level accessible washroom, named The Station Express Café. The cafe offers hot food, such as; breakfast rolls, pastries, instant noodles, and coffee for purchase. And light snacks, such as; chocolate bars, chips, and muffins. 

One major variant is the cab car. In 2014, Metrolinx (the provincial agency operating GO Transit) and Bombardier announced a new cab car design, which included a larger cab end and crash-energy management crumple zones. The new cab car has been purchased by Sounder Commuter Rail, Altamont Corridor Express, and COASTER. 

BiLevel coaches have 480 V head end power (HEP) systems except those for GO Transit, which have 575 V HEP systems. (The 575 V HEP system is a Canadian standard, having been previously used by CN for their Tempo cars.) A 575 V HEP power unit is supplied with GO coaches leased to other operators and GO leases locomotives with 480 V HEP when they lease coaches from other agencies.

Comparison with other Bombardier bilevel coaches 
Bombardier also produces two other bilevel railway coach models, the MultiLevel and the Double-deck Coach. The MultiLevel conforms to a smaller loading gauge than the BiLevel for the tighter clearances found on the Washington, D.C.–Boston Northeast Corridor and the Mont Royal Tunnel used by Exo in Montréal. It has doors on the middle level rather than the lower level in order to serve the high-level platforms in those two regions. The Double-deck Coach is designed, built and operated in Germany; it conforms to the German loading gauge and features a cross-sectional profile that narrows towards the upper level.

Series

Operators

References

External links

 The Bi-Level Coaches (from transittoronto.ca)
 Bombardier BiLevel in Canada and the USA - Bombardier

Rail passenger cars of the United States
Bombardier Transportation rail vehicles
GO Transit
Exo (public transit)
Metrolink (California)
West Coast Express
Tri-Rail
Sounder commuter rail
Caltrain
Altamont Corridor Express
Double-decker rail vehicles